Lifelong Ambitions is a live album by American jazz violinist Leroy Jenkins recorded in 1977 for the Italian Black Saint label.

Reception

The AllMusic review by Ron Wynn awarded the album 4½ stars stating "Leroy Jenkins, free jazz's greatest violinist, has always worked best in intimate situations with equally talented partners. He certainly had the optimum conditions on this duet date".

The authors of The Penguin Guide to Jazz Recordings awarded the album 3 stars, and commented: "The duos with Abrams are... both traditionally minded and innovative... Like their titles... the pieces are kept pretty abstract (and are all almost exactly the same length). There's a patient, almost schoolmasterly side to Abrams's playing. Jenkins moves off into pan-tonality a few times, but he stays firmly anchored in an identifiable key for most of the set, even when his partner has dissolved the normal ties of melody and accompaniment."

Track listing
All compositions by Leroy Jenkins
 "Greetings and Salutations" - 6:29
 "Meditation" - 6:26
 "Happiness" - 6:38
 "The Blues" - 6:37
 "The Weird World" - 6:28
 "The Father, the Son, the Holy Ghost" - 6:25
Recorded at the Washington Square Church in New York City on March 11, 1977

Personnel
Leroy Jenkins - violin
Muhal Richard Abrams - piano

References

Black Saint/Soul Note live albums
Leroy Jenkins (jazz musician) live albums
1977 live albums